Class C: Auxiliary Sciences of History is a classification used by the Library of Congress Classification system. This article outlines the subclasses of Class C.

C - Auxiliary Sciences of History 

1-51.......Auxiliary Sciences of History (General)

CB - History of Civilization 

156...........Terrestrial evidence of interplanetary voyages
158-161.......Forecasts of future progress
195-281.......Civilization and race
305-430.......By period
440-482.......Relation to special topics
450.......Geography and civilization
478.......Technology
481.......War and civilization
482.......Water and civilization

CC - Archaeology

72-81.......Philosophy. Theory
73-81.......Methodology
83-97........Study and teaching. Research
135-137....Preservation, restoration, and conservation of antiquities. Antiquities and state
140............Forgeries of antiquities
200-260.....Bells. Campanology. Cowbells
300-350.....Crosses
600-605.....Boundary stones
700-705.....Stone heaps, cairns, etc., of unknown purpose
710............Hill figures
960............Lanterns of the dead

CD - Diplomatics; Archives; Seals 

1-511.......Diplomatics
70-79.........Practice of special chancelleries
80-81.........Formularies
87...............Forgeries of documents
91-392........Collection of documents, facsimiles, etc., for study
501-511.....Study and teaching
921-4280....Archives
995-4280....History and statistics
997................Biography of archivists
1000-4280.....By region or country
5001-6471...Seals
5191..............Iconography
5201-5391...Ancient
5501-5557...Medieval
5561.............Renaissance
5575-6471...Modern

CE - Technical Chronology; Calendar 

21-46.......Ancient
51-85.......Medieval and modern
91-92.......Perpetual calendars. Century calendars, etc.

CJ - Numismatics 

1-4625.......Coins
153..........Finds of coins
161..........Symbols, devices, etc.
201-1397.....Ancient
1509-4625....Medieval and modern
4801-5450....Tokens
4861-4889....By period
4901-5336....By region or country
5350-5450....Special uses of tokens
5501-6661....Medals and medallions
5581-5690....Ancient
5723-5793....Medieval and modern
5795-6661....By region or country

CN - Inscriptions; Epigraphy 

120-740.......Ancient inscriptions
750-753.......Early Christian inscriptions
755..............Medieval inscriptions (General)
760..............Modern inscriptions (General)
805-865.......By language
870-1355......By region or country

CR - Heraldry 

51-79.......Crests, monograms, devices, badges, mottoes, etc.
91-93.......Shields and supporters
101-115.....Flags, banners, and standards
191-1020....Public and official heraldry
1101-1131...Ecclesiastical and sacred heraldry
1179-3395...Family heraldry
3499-4420...Titles of honor, rank, precedence, etc.
4480-4485...Royalty. Insignia. Regalia, crown and coronets, etc.
4501-6305...Chivalry and knighthood (Orders, decorations, etc.)
4547-4553.......Ceremonials, pageants, tournaments, etc.
4571-4595.......Duels and dueling
4651-6305.......Orders, etc.

CS - Genealogy 

23-35...........Genealogical lists, etc., covering more than one country or continent
38-39...........Family history covering more than one country
42-2209.......By region or country
2300-3090...Personal and family names

CT - Biography

21-22.......Biography as an art or literary form
31-83.......History of biographical literature. Lives of biographers
93-206......General collective biography
206........Portraits
210-3150....National biography
3200-9999...Biography. By subject
3200-3830.......Biography of women (Collective)
3990.................Academicians. Scholars. Savants
9960-9998.......Other miscellaneous groups (Including adventurers, eccentrics, misers, etc.)
9999.................Blank books for personal records, diaries, etc.

References

Further reading
 Virtual Library Historical Auxiliary Sciences: http://www.vl-ghw.uni-muenchen.de/hw_en.html
 Full schedule of all LCC Classifications

C